List of the National Register of Historic Places listings in Union County, New Jersey


Current listings

This is intended to be a complete list of properties and districts listed on the National Register of Historic Places in Union County, New Jersey. The locations of National Register properties and districts (at least for all showing latitude and longitude coordinates below) may be seen in an online map by clicking on "Map of all coordinates".

|}

Former listings

|}

References

Union

Tourist attractions in Union County, New Jersey

History of Union County, New Jersey